This is a List of clubs in the Oberliga Westfalen, including all clubs and their final placings from the inaugural season 1978–79 to the current one. The league, is the highest football league in the Westphalia (German: Westfalen) region of the state of North Rhine-Westphalia. It is one of fourteen Oberligas in German football, the fifth tier of the German football league system. Until the introduction of the 3. Liga in 2008 it was the fourth tier of the league system, until the introduction of the Regionalligas in 1994 the third tier. From 2008 to 2012 the league was defunct but then reformed again.

Overview
The league was formed in 1978 to slot in above the Verbandsliga Westfalen which had been operating at this level up to then in two regional divisions. Originally it carried the name Amateur-Oberliga Westfalen. In 1994, when the Regionalliga West/Südwest was formed, the league changed its official name, now to Oberliga Westfalen, and became a tier four league. From 2000 onwards it became a feeder league to the Regionalliga Nord, after the Regionalliga West/Südwest had been disbanded. In 2008, when the Regionalliga West was introduced, the league was disbanded in favour of the NRW-Liga. The latter was disbanded again in 2012 and the Oberliga Westfalen reintroduced..

League timeline
The league went through the following timeline of name changes, format and position in the league system:

List of clubs
This is a complete list of clubs, as of the 2022–23 season, sorted by the last season a club played in the league:

Key

Notes
 1 In 1985 Tus Schloß Neuhaus merged with FC Paderborn to form TuS Paderborn-Neuhaus. In 1997 the club changed its name to SC Paderborn 07.
 2 In 1992 ASC Schöppingen withdrew from the league.
 3 In 1994 VfB Rheine changed its name to Eintracht Rheine.
 4 In 1996 Tus Ahlen and BW Ahlen merged to form LR Ahlen, which changed its name to Rot-Weiß Ahlen in 2006.
 5 In 1997 VfR Sölde withdrew from the league.
 6 In 2004 SG Wattenscheid 09 II had to withdraw from the league because the first team of the club was relegated to the Oberliga. 
 7 In 2014 Arminia Bielefeld II was ineligible for promotion as the senior team played in the 3. Liga and the reserve team of a 3. Liga clubs could not enter the Regionalliga. In 2018 Arminia II withdrew from the league.
 8 In 2017 SC Hassel and TSV Marl-Hüls withdrew from the league.

League placings
The complete list of clubs in the league and their league placings.

Amateur-Oberliga Westfalen
The complete list of clubs and placings in the league while operating as the tier three Amateur-Oberliga Westfalen from 1978 to 1994:

Oberliga Westfalen 1994–2008
The complete list of clubs and placings in the league while operating as the tier four (1994–2008) and five (2008–2012) Oberliga Westfalen:

Oberliga Westfalen 2012–present
The complete list of clubs and placings in the league while operating as the reformed tier five Oberliga Westfalen:

References

Sources
 Deutschlands Fußball in Zahlen,  An annual publication with tables and results from the Bundesliga to Verbandsliga/Landesliga. DSFS.
 Kicker Almanach,  The yearbook on German football from Bundesliga to Oberliga, since 1937. Kicker Sports Magazine.
 Die Deutsche Liga-Chronik 1945-2005  History of German football from 1945 to 2005 in tables. DSFS. 2006.

External links 
   

Oberliga Westfalen
Football competitions in North Rhine-Westphalia

Westfalen